Wee-Gbehy-Mahn District is one of 17 districts of Nimba County, Liberia. As of 2008, the population was 32,934.

References

 

Districts of Liberia
Nimba County